Niveria is a genus of small sea snails, marine gastropod molluscs in the family Triviidae, the false cowries or trivias.

Species
Species within the genus Niveria include:
 † Niveria angliae (S. V. Wood, 1848) 
 † Niveria avellana (J. de C. Sowerby, 1822) 
 Niveria bieleri Fehse & Grego, 2016
 Niveria brasilica Fehse & Grego, 2005
 † Niveria callosa Fehse, 2021 
 † Niveria cylindriclementi Landau, Ceulemans & Van Dingenen, 2018 
 † Niveria dimidiatoaffinis (Sacco, 1894) 
 † Niveria excoccinella (Sacco, 1894) 
 Niveria guyana Fehse, 2016
 Niveria harriettae Fehse & Grego, 2010
 † Niveria intuscrenata (Cossmann & Pissarro, 1905) 
 Niveria lathyrus (Blainville, 1826)
 † Niveria ledoni Fehse & Vicián, 2020 
 Niveria liltvedi (Gofas, 1984)
 Niveria macaeica (Fehse & Grego, 2005)
 Niveria maltbiana (Schwengel & McGinty, 1942)
 Niveria maugeriae (Sowerby, 1832)
 † Niveria miocarinata Fehse & Vicián, 2020 
 Niveria nix (Schilder, 1922)
 † Niveria novosperara Fehse, 2021 
 Niveria pacifica (Sowerby, 1832)
 † Niveria peyreirensis (Cossmann & Peyrot, 1922) 
 † Niveria pseudoavellana (Sacco, 1894) 
 Niveria pullata (G. B. Sowerby II, 1870)
 Niveria quadripunctata (Gray, 1827)
 Niveria simonei Fehse, 2016
 Niveria suffusa (Gray, 1827)
 Niveria werneri Fehse, 1999
 Niveria xishaensis Ma, 1997

Species brought into synonymy 
 Niveria aquatanica Cate, 1979: synonym of  Niveria nix (Schilder, 1922)
 Niveria campus (Cate, 1979): synonym of Pseudopusula campus (C. N. Cate, 1979)
 Niveria carabus (Cate, 1979): synonym of Pseudopusula sanguinea (J. E. Gray in G. B. Sowerby I, 1832)
 Niveria cherobia (Cate, 1979): synonym of Pseudopusula rubescens (J. E. Gray, 1833)

 Niveria circumdata (Schilder, 1931): synonym of Pseudopusula circumdata (F. A. Schilder, 1931)
 Niveria colettae Fehse, 1999: synonym of Cleotrivia coletteae (Fehse, 1999)
 Niveria corallina Cate, 1979 : synonym of Cleotrivia corallina (Cate, 1979)
 †  Niveria dalli Petuch, 1994: synonym of † Pusula dalli (Petuch, 1994) 
 Niveria dorsennus Cate, 1979: synonym of Dolichupis dorsennus (Cate, 1979)
 Niveria fusca (Sowerby, 1832): synonym of Pseudopusula fusca (Gray in G. B. Sowerby I, 1832)
 Niveria galapagensis (Melvill, 1900): synonym of Pseudopusula galapagensis (Melvill, 1900)
 Niveria grohorum Fehse & Grego, 2008: synonym of Trivia grohorum (Fehse & Grego, 2008)
 † Niveria incomparabilis Fehse, 2013: synonym of † Pseudopusula incomparabilis (Fehse, 2013) (original combination)
 † Niveria jozefgregoi Fehse, 2011: synonym of † Pseudopusula jozefgregoi (Fehse, 2011)  (original combination)
 Niveria meridionalis Cate, 1979: synonym of Dolichupis meridionalis (Cate, 1979)
 †  Niveria permagna (Johnson, 1910): synonym of † Pusula permagna (Johnson, 1910) 
 Niveria problematica (Schilder, 1931): synonym of Pseudopusula problematica (F. A. Schilder, 1931)
 Niveria rubescens (Gray, 1833): synonym of Pseudopusula rubescens (J. E. Gray, 1833)
 Niveria sanguinea (Sowerby, 1832): synonym of Pseudopusula sanguinea (Sowerby, 1832)
 Niveria spongicola (Monterosato, 1923): synonym of Trivia spongicola Monterosato, 1923

References

 Fehse D. (2002) Beiträge zur Kenntnis der Triviidae (Mollusca: Gastropoda) V. Kritische Beurteilung der Genera und Beschreibung einer neuen Art der Gattung Semitrivia Cossmann, 1903. Acta Conchyliorum 6: 3–48. page(s): 9
 Fehse D. & Grego J. (2014). Contributions to the knowledge of the Triviidae. XXVIII. Revision of the genus Pusula Jousseaume, 1884 with the description of new genera and new species (Mollusca: Gastropoda). Published by the authors. 144 pp.

External links
  Cate, C. N. (1979). A review of the Triviidae (Mollusca: Gastropoda). San Diego Society of Natural History, Memoir. 10: 1-126

Triviidae